Cacoethes may refer to:

Cacoethes (horse) (1986–2009), American-bred British-trained race horse
Cacoethes (moth), a genus of tiger moths, taxonomic synonym for Amata
 Rheinhold Cacoethes, a fictional character in The Dharma Bums by Jack Kerouac, based on Kenneth Rexroth

See also
 Mania, a mental and behavioral disorder
 Cacoethes scribendi (lit. 'insatiable desire to write') at List of Latin phrases (C)